All Stretton Halt was a minor railway station on the Welsh Marches Line between Shrewsbury and Church Stretton in the English county of Shropshire.

History
Opened by the independent Shrewsbury and Hereford Railway, the line through All Stretton became a joint Great Western Railway and London, Midland and Scottish Railway line during the Grouping of 1923. The line then passed on to the London Midland Region of British Railways on nationalisation in 1948. The station was then closed by the British Transport Commission.

The site today
Trains continue to run on the Welsh Marches Line. Nothing remains of the halt. The nearest station to All Stretton is now at Church Stretton, a mile to the south.

See also
Little Stretton Halt railway station

References
 
 
 
 Station on navigable O.S. map

Church Stretton
Disused railway stations in Shropshire
Former Shrewsbury and Hereford Railway stations
Railway stations in Great Britain opened in 1936
Railway stations in Great Britain closed in 1943
Railway stations in Great Britain opened in 1946
Railway stations in Great Britain closed in 1958
1936 establishments in England